Manchester North East was one of several Parliamentary constituencies created in 1885 from the former Manchester constituency.  It was abolished in 1918.

C. P. Scott, the editor and then part-owner of the Manchester Guardian stood unsuccessfully in 1886, 1891 and 1892.  John Robert Clynes (1906–1918) later became leader of the Labour Party.

Members of Parliament

Election results

Elections in the 1880s

Elections in the 1890s

 Caused by Ferguson's appointment as Postmaster General

Elections in the 1900s

Elections in the 1910s

References

Sources 
Election Results:
https://web.archive.org/web/20060520143104/http://www.manchester.gov.uk/elections/archive/gen1900.htm
https://web.archive.org/web/20060520143047/http://www.manchester.gov.uk/elections/archive/gen1945.htm
Vaudrey:
http://www.spinningtheweb.org.uk/bookbrowse.php?page=47&book=F920.04273T1&size=292x400

North East
Constituencies of the Parliament of the United Kingdom established in 1885
Constituencies of the Parliament of the United Kingdom disestablished in 1918